Lanu may refer to:

People
  (born 1961), Finnish musician
 Olavi Lanu (1925–2015), Finnish sculptor

Places
 Lanu, South Khorasan, Iran
 Lañu, Spain